Kabgian may refer to:
Kabgian District
Kabgian Rural District